William Swaddon was Member of Parliament for Calne from 1604 to 1605 when he asked to resign owing to ill health. His son was Archdeacon of Worcester from 1610 to 1623.

Notes

People from Calne
English MPs 1604–1611